Ciba (pinyin: cíbā; "ba" means cake), also known as nianba ("nian" means New Year), is a traditional Chinese snack made by glutinous rice pounded into paste. It is often molded into shapes of balls or cuboids. Ciba is often fried or steamed before being served.

Popularity 

Ciba is mostly popular in southern China areas including Chongqing municipality, Guangdong province, Guangxi Zhuang autonomous region, Guizhou province, Sichuan province, Hunan province and Hubei province. 

There is also similar food in Japan, Korea and other countries, but preparation and eating methods are slightly different.

How to eat 
People usually dip ciba in brown sugar syrup and roasted soybean flour before eating. Eating methods vary depending on different regions and cultures. In Chongqing municipality, people like to order ciba as a snack when they eat Chongqing hot pot.

When to eat 
Traditionally, ciba is often served at Chinese festivals, especially Spring Festival. People also eat Ciba during family celebrations to share their joy and delight of festival.

Significance 
Ciba is glutinous and sticky, embodying Chinese people's attitude on kinship and friendship to stay close to each other. Some ciba cakes are round, meaning reunion in Chinese. During festivals, people usually make many ciba cakes, which requires the cooperation of many people from a big family or several families. Therefore, ciba cakes often represent family reunion and good luck at New Year.

Special activity – pounding ciba 
Traditionally, people put cooked glutinous rice into a wooden or stone mortar and use large wooden pestles to pound. People use wooden or stone materials because glutinous rice will not stick to them. Usually, two people take turns to use large wooden pestles to pound rice in the mortar for around 30 minutes, and they add some water in mortar occasionally. People will then shape glutinous rice by hand and cook it. In places such as Ciqikou in Chongqing municipality, there are still people pounding Ciba in street shops.

Common ingredients 
Basic ingredients

 Water
 Glutinous rice flour

People can also add

 Peanut
 Sesame seeds
 Sugar
 Brown sugar
 Osmanthus fragrans (桂花)
 Honey

Related dishes 

 Nian gao
 Mochi
 Mochi ice cream
 Rice cake
 Gyeongdan
 Osmanthus cake
 Qingtuan

References

 Pounding Ciba
 Hunan Ciba

External links

 "Hand-made Ciba" 
 "All you need to know about Ciba" 

Chinese cuisine
Rice cakes